Kalitta Air Flight 207 (K4207/CKS207) was a scheduled cargo flight between John F. Kennedy Airport to Bahrain International Airport with a technical stopover at Brussels. On May 25, 2008, the Boeing 747-200 overran Runway 20 during takeoff at Brussels Airport, causing the aircraft to split into 3 main pieces. The occupants sustained minor injuries.

Aircraft and crew 

The aircraft was a 27 year old Boeing 747-209F registered as N704CK. The aircraft was built in July 1980 for China Airlines with the registration B-1894. It was re-registered as B-18752, operating for the same airline and operated until the end of August 2003 before it was purchased by Kalitta Air in September of the same year and registered as N704CK. The aircraft accumulated 108,560 flight hours with 20,599 flight cycles. The aircraft was equipped with Pratt & Whitney JT9D-7Q engines with serial numbers (from leftmost engine to rightmost engine) 702399, 702394, 702119 and 702082. Engine No.3 was once reported to be in flames in April 2008. The engine was replaced and the damage sustained to the aircraft was repaired. There were 4 crew members and 1 passenger onboard. The captain was 59 years old and was a qualified captain on the Boeing 747, 757, 767 and the McDonnell Douglas DC-8. He had accumulated 15,000 flight hours throughout his career, including 3,000 flight hours in the Boeing 747. The first officer was 48 years old and was a qualified first officer on the Boeing 747, Gulfstream G500, Canadair CL-65 and Saab 340. He had accumulated 7,000 flight hours, including 200 flight hours on the Boeing 747. The flight engineer was 53 years old and was a qualified flight engineer. He had accumulated 7,000 flight hours throughout his career, including 1,950 flight hours on the Boeing 747. The flight carried 76 tonnes of cargo.

Flight 
The flight was carried out at 11:06 A.M. Flight CKS207 requested for pushback. The flight crew then requested clearance to taxi at 11:13 A.M. The controller requested the crew to taxi to A7 and hold short of Runway 25R. They were later asked to contact the tower controller. The crew neglected the decision of lining up with runway 25R and requested to taxi to runway 19, as that runway was used for take-off's whereas 25R was used for landings. They were asked to line-up behind a Korean Air Boeing 747 and wait for their turn to take-off. At 11:29 A.M., they were cleared for take-off from runway 20. At approximately 11:30 A.M., the crew heard a loud bang, followed by an explosion on Engine No.3. They decided to cancel the take-off by engaging the thrust-reversers and setting the engine power to idle. The thrust reversers did not engage and since they had crossed V1 speed (138 knots) by 12 knots, they could not stop in time and overran the runway. Flight 207 stopped 300m from the end of runway 19 and 100m from a railroad just ahead. The aircraft broke into three main pieces: the cockpit, the fuselage and the tail. The tower immediately called for fire trucks to arrive at the scene. The firefighters coated the wings with fire retardant as the plane was filled with fuel, however, the aircraft did not catch fire. A witness heard a "slight knock" and noticed a plane charging towards him. The witness immediately ran for cover.

Investigation 
The investigation authority arrived at the crash site an hour later. The accident was investigated by the Aircraft Accident Investigation Belgium. It was determined that there were traces of the European kestrel inside Engine No.3 causing it to lose power and fail, which was accompanied by a loud bang and it was noticed by the crew with immediate actions to slow down the plane. The Runway End Safety Area (RESA), a part of the runway which helps the aircraft to stop in time, of Runway 20 was met in terms of both length (90m) and width (90m). However, the increase of the RESA to 240m was not met. This was because of a railway ahead of the runway and a road at the other end. The bird strike also caused the thrust reversers to not engage, therefore not adequately slowing down the aircraft. The bird strike, the malfunctioning of the thrust reverser and the lack of situational awareness contributed to the crash of Flight 207.

Aftermath 
The crew had minor injuries. The training towards rejecting a takeoff after V1 for Kalitta Air was modified. The information was given in a DVD depicting the same runway as the accident flight in Brussels. The RESA has been made stricter about the Runway extension to 240m which Runway 19 did not comply with. The Bird Control Unit (BCU) was also reinforced to be more accurate and subsequent training for its  use has also been provided in the DVD. The use of the full length of Runway 19 was never published in the Aeronautical Information Publication (AIP). It was only exclusive to Runway 25R. A dedicated sentence has also now been provided for Runway 19.

See also 

 US Airways Flight 1549, another flight accompanied by a birdstrike during takeoff.
 Ryanair Flight 4102, another birdstrike incident in 2008.
 Fine Air Flight 101
 Emery Worldwide Airlines Flight 17
 Centurion Air Cargo Flight 164

References

External links 

 Final Report - AAIU Belgium
 Accident Description - at the Aviation Safety Network
 Accident Description - at the Bureau of Aircraft Accident Archives



Airliner accidents and incidents caused by bird strikes
Airliner accidents and incidents caused by engine failure
Accidents and incidents involving the Boeing 747
Aviation accidents and incidents in 2008
2008 in Belgium
Aviation accidents and incidents in Belgium